Nikolaos Zakharopoulos (born 1944) is a Greek former swimmer. He competed in the men's 200 metre breaststroke at the 1960 Summer Olympics.

References

1944 births
Living people
Greek male swimmers
Olympic swimmers of Greece
Swimmers at the 1960 Summer Olympics
Sportspeople from Patras
Male breaststroke swimmers